Hambleton is a small village and civil parish near to Selby in North Yorkshire, England. It is a ward of the Selby District and should not be confused with the Hambleton District, another district of North Yorkshire.

The village was historically part of the West Riding of Yorkshire until 1974.

History

The village is mentioned in the Domesday Book as Hameltun which means Hamela's town. The A63 road, Leeds to Selby, runs through the village.

According to the 2001 UK census, the population of Hambleton parish was 1,711, increasing to 1,859 at the 2011 Census.

There are two pubs: The Red Lion and The Owl. There is also a village shop.
As of September 2014, the Wheatsheaf pub has closed and went up for sale - during June 2015 demolition of the building commenced.

Hambleton used to have a railway station, off Station Road, which closed to passengers in 1959.

Governance
The name Hambleton is now also assigned to an electoral ward. This ward also covers Thorpe Willoughby and surrounding areas. The total population of the ward taken at the 2011 Census was 5,315.

See also
Hambleton Junction - a railway junction between the East Coast Main Line and the Leeds to Selby Line north of the village

References 

Villages in North Yorkshire
Civil parishes in North Yorkshire
Selby District